Johab Pascal (born 10 March 2000) is a professional footballer who plays as a midfielder for Championnat National 3 side Bordeaux B. Born in Guadeloupe, he represents Haiti at international level.

Club career 
Pascal made his professional debut for Bordeaux in a 3–0 Coupe de France loss to Brest on 2 January 2022.

International career 
Pascal was born in Guadeloupe, an overseas territory of France. He has previously been called up for France at under-16 level and Haiti at under-23 and senior level.

References 

2000 births
Living people
People from Les Abymes
Guadeloupean footballers
French footballers
Haitian footballers
French sportspeople of Haitian descent
French people of Guadeloupean descent
Guadeloupean people of Haitian descent
Black French sportspeople
AS Gosier players
JA Drancy players
FC Girondins de Bordeaux players
Association football midfielders
Championnat National 2 players
Championnat National 3 players